Quantock Row  is a historic row house in Savannah, Georgia, United States. It comprises five units from 17 to 31 East Jones Street, and was completed in 1854. It is a contributing property of the Savannah Historic District, itself on the National Register of Historic Places. The row partly fills the block between Bull Street to the west and Drayton Street to the east.

The properties were built for Allen William Quantock by John Scudder. They were sold to Henry Meinhard in 1862 who, in turn, sold them to Gerard and Sarah Treanor.

Other similar-style row houses exist in Savannah's Scudder's Row, Gordon Row, the Chatham Square Quantock Row, William Remshart Row House, McDonough Row and Marshall Row.

Gallery

References

See also
Buildings in Savannah Historic District

Houses in Savannah, Georgia
Houses completed in 1854
Savannah Historic District